Matthew Dale Winslow is a Republican member of the North Carolina House of Representatives representing the 7th district (including all of Franklin County and part of Nash County).

Electoral history

Committee assignments

2021-2022 session
Local Government 
Local Government - Land Use, Planning and Development (Vice Chair)
Commerce 
Energy and Public Utilities 
Finance 
Homeland Security, Military and Veterans Affairs

References

External links

Republican Party members of the North Carolina House of Representatives
Winslow, Matthew
Living people
21st-century American politicians
Date of birth missing (living people)
Year of birth missing (living people)